Carlos Humberto Lehman de Almeida Benholiel Lisboa Santos (born 23 July 1958), known as Carlos Lisboa, is a Portuguese former basketball player who played as a guard and forward. He is considered the greatest Portuguese basketball player of all-time. As a head coach, Lisboa most notably led Benfica from 2011 to 2017, winning 22 major titles, and from 2019 to 2021.

Early life and career
Lisboa was born in Praia, Cape Verde, to a Jewish origin metropolitan Portuguese father and to a German origin mother (Fernanda Lisboa Santos). He spent his youth in Mozambique, coming to Portugal in 1974. He started his basketball career in the then Portuguese colony, at the youth levels of Sporting Lourenço Marques. After his coming to Portugal, he played at the youth categories of Sporting CP, entering the first team, still at the youth level. He would be a leading name for Sporting, from 1975 to 1982, where he won three National Championships and two Cups of Portugal. He played at C.A. Queluz for the two following seasons, winning a Championship and a Cup of Portugal.

Lisboa, however, would achieve the greatest success of his long career as a Benfica player, playing there from 1984 to 1996, ending it aged 38 years old. During this period, he went to win ten National Championship titles and five Cups of Portugal, 4 League Cups and 3 Portuguese Super Cup.

Lisboa played 46 times for Portugal, from 1977 to 1992, but he never had the chance to show his talent at a major competition. 

After ending his player career, Lisboa became a coach, having coached Estoril Praia, Benfica, and Aveiro Basket.

Honours

Player
Sporting
 Portuguese League: 1977–78, 1980–81, 1981–82
 Portuguese Cup: 1977–78, 1979–80

Queluz
 Portuguese League: 1983–84
 Portuguese Cup: 1982–83

Benfica
 Portuguese League (10): 1984–85, 1985–86, 1986–87, 1988–89, 1989–90, 1990–91, 1991–92, 1992–93, 1993–94, 1994–95
 Portuguese Cup (5): 1991–92, 1992–93, 1993–94, 1994–95, 1995–96
 Portuguese Super Cup (6): 1985, 1989, 1991, 1994, 1995, 1996
 Portuguese League Cup (5): 1989–90, 1992–93, 1993–94, 1994–95, 1995–96

Head coach
Benfica
 Portuguese League (5): 2011–12, 2012–13, 2013–14, 2014–15, 2016–17
 Portuguese Cup (4): 2013–14, 2014–15, 2015–16, 2016–17
 Portuguese Super Cup (5): 1998, 2012, 2013, 2014, 2015
 Hugo dos Santos Cup (4): 2012–13, 2013–14, 2014–15, 2016–17
 António Pratas Trophy (4): 2011, 2012, 2014, 2015

References

External links
 FIBA Europe profile
 Carlos Lisboa interview 

1958 births
Living people
Portuguese basketball coaches
Portuguese Jews
Portuguese men's basketball players
S.L. Benfica basketball coaches
S.L. Benfica basketball players
Shooting guards
Small forwards
Sportspeople from Praia
Portuguese people of Cape Verdean descent